The depiction of night in paintings is common in Western art. Paintings that feature a night scene as the theme may be religious or history paintings, genre scenes, portraits, landscapes, or other subject types. Some artworks involve religious or fantasy topics using the quality of dim night light to create mysterious atmospheres. The source of illumination in a night scene—whether it is the moon or an artificial light source—may be depicted directly, or it may be implied by the character and coloration of the light that reflects from the subjects depicted.

Historical overview
Beginning in the early Renaissance, artists such as Giotto, Bosch, Uccello and others told stories with their painted works, sometimes evoking religious themes and sometimes depicting battles, myths, stories and scenes from history, using night-time as the setting. By the 16th and 17th centuries, painters of the late Renaissance, Mannerists, and painters from the Baroque era including El Greco, Titian, Giorgione, Caravaggio, Frans Hals, Rembrandt, Velázquez, Jusepe de Ribera often portrayed people and scenes in night-time settings, illustrating stories and depictions of real life.

Eighteenth-century Rococo painters Antoine Watteau, François Boucher, Jean-Honoré Fragonard, and others used the night-time theme to illustrate scenes of the imagination, often with dramatic literary connotations, including scenes of secret liaisons and romantic relationships reminiscent of the popular 1782 book Les Liaisons dangereuses by Pierre Choderlos de Laclos. Jean-Baptiste-Siméon Chardin, Jean-Baptiste Greuze, used the themes of nighttime to depict illustrations of ordinary life. Poet and painter William Blake and painter Henry Fuseli used the night-time in their work as the setting for many of their most imaginative visions. The most dramatic use of the night-time can be seen in the 1793 painting by Jacques-Louis David, called The Death of Marat, portraying the French revolutionary leader Jean-Paul Marat after his murder by Charlotte Corday.

The night in paintings of the 19th century was used to convey a complex of diverse meanings. A mystical, religious, and sublime reverence for nature is seen in Caspar David Friedrich, Thomas Cole, Frederick Church, Albert Bierstadt, Albert Pinkham Ryder and others, while the powerful and dramatic romanticism of Francisco Goya, Théodore Géricault, and Eugène Delacroix served as visual reportage of current events, and in the case of Géricault revealed a scandal. Gustave Courbet, who with Honoré Daumier, Jules Breton, Jean-François Millet, and others created the Realist school, portrayed ordinary people hard at work, traveling, or engrossed in their everyday lives, at night and during the day. The Impressionists and Post-Impressionists of the late 19th century used the night-time theme to express a multitude of emotional and aesthetic insights seen most dramatically in the paintings of Edgar Degas, Paul Cézanne, Vincent van Gogh and others.

Symbolism

Black and grey shades often symbolize gloom, fear, mystery, superstitions, evil, death, secret, sorrow. The light source in most religious paintings symbolize hope, guidance or divinity.

In fantasy paintings light could symbolize magic, like the following lines of a poem entitled The Magic: "There's magic in this night, enshrouded in this night, hidden, like a lamp in an old man's robe, there's MAGIC."

History

14th century

Gaddi, The Angelic Announcement to the Shepherds
One of the first attempts in depicting night in paintings was by Taddeo Gaddi, an Italian painter and architect. Gaddi, fascinated by nocturnal lighting, depicted the effect of the light in The Angelic Announcement to the Shepherds night scene. The fresco at Basilica of Santa Croce in Florence, Italy features an incandescent angel as it hovers over a shepherd. Against the night sky the brilliance of the angel's bright glow, likely intended as "verification of the presence of God and as a metaphor for spiritual enlightenment", appears to startle the shepherd. Gaddi's use of monochromatic colors in and around the shepherd reveals how the colors are made pale due to the remarkable illumination.

Giotto, Crucifixion
Giotto di Bondone (1266/7–1337), Taddeo Gaddi's teacher and godfather, created the fresco of Crucifixion, one of the multiple frescoes that told the story of Christ's life, for the Arena Chapel. He depicts Christ on a cross, while the Virgin Mary is comforted by John. Kneeling at his feet is Mary Magdalene, and swirling in the sky above Jesus and the watching crowd's heads are a number of angels. Giotto depicts night and heaven through the use of a deep blue background in the fresco panel and use of stars in the otherwise blue ceiling. He was able to create depth and dimension through the use of incremental degrees of light and dark shades, the precursor to chiaroscuro. He also used light in a way to represent the divinity of people and angels from the Bible, as he did in other frescoes at Arena Chapel.

15th century

The Western tradition began properly in the 15th century, especially with depictions in illuminated manuscripts of the biblical night-time scenes of the Annunciation to the Shepherds in the Nativity story, and the Arrest of Christ and Agony in the Garden in the Passion of Christ.

Très Riches Heures, Christ in Gethsemane
In the book of miniatures, Très Riches Heures du Duc de Berry, the scene of Christ in Gethsemane is an apcolyptic one which foretells the death of Christ, through the presence of three comets in the evening sky.

Uccello, Niccolò Mauruzi da Tolentino at the Battle of San Romano

Niccolò Mauruzi da Tolentino at the Battle of San Romano is one of a three painting series that captures the Battle of San Romano. The passage of time, from dawn to evening, is illustrated in the three paintings with the initial use of pale, pastel shades and increasingly darker tones as the battle progresses.

Geertgen, Nativity at Night
Influenced by a vision of Saint Bridget of Sweden (1303–1373), Geertgen tot Sint Jans's Nativity at Night depicts the infant Jesus who "radiated such an ineffable light and splendour, that the sun was not comparable to it, nor did the candle that St. Joseph had put there, give any light at all, the divine light totally annihilating the material light of the candle." Strengthening the message about the baby Jesus being the light source, Geertgen depicts the child as the only source of illumination for the main scene inside the stable. Aglow are the faces of the angels, St Joseph and Virgin Mary. Although the shepherds' fire on the hill behind and the angel outside the window create a light source, it's dim in comparison to that provided by the infant child. The sharp contrast of the divine light against dark is a tool used to make the scene appear more profound for its viewers. London's National Gallery describes Geertgen's work as: "one of the most engaging and convincing early treatments of the Nativity as a night scene.

Annunciation to the Shepherds
In the still of the night, the only source of light radiates in Annunciation to the Shepherds comes from an angel who has come to tell the shepherds of the birth of the infant Christ. The light is so brilliant that the Bethlehem shepherds must shield their eyes. Aside from the startling angel, the nocturnal painting is a pleasant, still pastoral scene with a group of angels in the distance.

16th century

Dosso Dossi
Dosso Dossi ( – 1542), was an Italian Renaissance painter who belonged to the Ferrara School of Painting.

Albrecht Altdorfer
Albrecht Altdorfer ( – 12 February 1538) was a German painter, engraver and architect of the Renaissance of the so-called Danube School setting biblical and historical subjects against landscape backgrounds of expressive colours.

Giuseppe Cesari
Giuseppe Cesari ( – 3 July 1640) was an Italian Mannerist painter and instructor to Caravaggio.

17th century

Adam Elsheimer
Early Baroque artist Adam Elsheimer created night scenes that were highly original. His works departed slightly  from other works of the Baroque period were dramatic and abundantly detailed. Baroque paintings featured "exaggerated lighting, intense emotions, release from restraint, and even a kind of artistic sensationalism". Elsheimer's lighting effects in general were very subtle, and very different from those of Caravaggio. He often uses as many as five different sources of light, and graduates the light relatively gently, with the less well-lit parts of the composition often containing important parts of it.

Michelangelo Merisi da Caravaggio
Michelangelo Merisi da Caravaggio was an Italian artist active between 1593 and 1610. His paintings, which combine a realistic observation of the human state, both physical and emotional, with a dramatic use of lighting, had a formative influence on the Baroque school of painting. Caravaggio's novelty was a radical naturalism that combined close physical observation with a dramatic, even theatrical, use of chiaroscuro. This came to be known as Tenebrism, the shift from light to dark with little intermediate value.

Georges de La Tour
Georges de La Tour was a French Baroque painter who painted mostly religious chiaroscuro scenes lit by candlelight, which were more developed than his artistic predecessors, yet lacked dramatic effects of Caravaggio. He created some of the most arresting works in this genre, portraying a wide range of scenes by candlelight from card games to New Testament narratives.

Aert van der Neer
The Dutch Golden Age painter Aert van der Neer was a landscape painter, specializing in small night scenes lit only by moonlight and fires, and snowy winter landscapes, both often looking down a canal or river.

Anthony van Dyck
Anthony van Dyck (22 March 1599 – 9 December 1641) was a Flemish Baroque artist and leading court painter in England.

18th century

Joseph Turner
Joseph Mallord William Turner (23 April 1775 – 19 December 1851) was an English Romantic landscape painter, who is commonly known as "the painter of light".

Joseph Vernet
Claude-Joseph Vernet (14 August 1714 – 3 December 1789) was a French painter whose landscapes, including those of moonlights were popular with English aristocrats. His The Port of Rochefort (1763, Musée national de la Marine) is particularly notable; in the piece Vernet is able to achieve, according to art historian Michael Levey, one of his most 'crystalline and atmospherically sensitive skies'.

Joseph Wright
Joseph Wright of Derby (3 September 1734 – 29 August 1797) was an English landscape and portrait painter who is notable for his use of Chiaroscuro effect, which emphasises the contrast of light and dark, and for his paintings of candle-lit subjects. Wright is seen at his best in his candlelit subjects. The Three Gentlemen observing the 'Gladiator' (1765). A Philosopher Lecturing on the Orrery shows an early mechanism for demonstrating the movement of the planets around the sun. An Experiment on a Bird in the Air Pump (1768) shows people gathered round observing an early experiment into the nature of air and its ability to support life.

These factual paintings are considered to have metaphorical meaning too, the bursting into light of the phosphorus in front of a praying figure signifying the problematic transition from faith to scientific understanding and enlightenment, and the various expressions on the figures around the bird in the air pump indicating concern over the possible inhumanity of the coming age of science.

19th century

Théodore Géricault
Théodore Géricault (26 September 1791 – 26 January 1824) was an influential French artist and one of the pioneers of the Romantic movement.

Atkinson Grimshaw

Atkinson Grimshaw (6 September 1836 – 13 October 1893) was a Victorian-era artist known for his city night-scenes and landscapes. His careful painting and skill in lighting effects meant that he captured both the appearance and the mood of a scene in minute detail. His "paintings of dampened gas-lit streets and misty waterfronts conveyed an eerie warmth as well as alienation in the urban scene."

On Hampstead Hill is considered one of Grimshaw's finest works, exemplifying his skill with a variety of light sources, in capturing the mood of the passing of twilight into night. In his later career his urban scenes under twilight or yellow streetlighting were popular with his middle-class patrons.

In the 1880s, Grimshaw maintained a London studio in Chelsea, not far from the studio of James Abbott McNeill Whistler. After visiting Grimshaw, Whistler remarked that "I considered myself the inventor of Nocturnes until I saw Grimmy's moonlit pictures." Unlike Whistler's Impressionistic night scenes Grimshaw worked in a realistic vein: "sharply focused, almost photographic," his pictures innovated in applying the tradition of rural moonlight images to the Victorian city, recording "the rain and mist, the puddles and smoky fog of late Victorian industrial England with great poetry."

Petrus van Schendel
Petrus van Schendel (1806–1870) was a Dutch Romantic painter, etcher and draughtsman. Van Schendel specialised in nocturnal Dutch market scenes, exploring the effects the soft light had upon his subjects, as a result he was named Monsieur Chandelle by the French. Van Schendel was inspired by these famous forebears, but brought a unique nineteenth century mood to his night scenes. He eloquently captured the mysterious world of city markets illuminated by lamps and moonlight before the dawn.

James Abbott McNeill Whistler

James Abbott McNeill Whistler (11 July 1834 – 17 July 1903) was an American-born, British-based artist.

Whistler's ill-advised journey in 1866 to Valparaíso, Chile, resulted in Whistler's first three nocturnal paintings—which he termed "moonlights" and later re-titled as "nocturnes"—night scenes of the harbor painted with a blue or light green palette. Later in London, he painted several more nocturnes over the next ten years, many of the River Thames and of Cremorne Gardens, a pleasure park famous for its frequent fireworks displays, which presented a novel challenge to paint. In his maritime nocturnes, Whistler used highly thinned paint as a ground with lightly flicked color to suggest ships, lights, and shore line. Some of the Thames paintings also show compositional and thematic similarities with the Japanese prints of Hiroshige.

In 1877 Whistler sued the art critic John Ruskin for libel after the critic condemned his painting Nocturne in Black and Gold: The Falling Rocket. Ruskin accused Whistler of "asking two hundred guineas for throwing a pot of paint in the public's face." Whistler won the suit, but was awarded one farthing for damages. The cost of the case bankrupted him. It has been suggested John Ruskin had had CADASIL and the visual disturbances this condition caused him might have been a factor in his irritation at this particular painting. Whistler published his account of the trial in the pamphlet Whistler v. Ruskin: Art and Art Critics, included in his later The Gentle Art of Making Enemies (1890).

20th century

Famous examples
[[File:El Tres de Mayo, by Francisco de Goya, from Prado thin black margin.jpg|thumb|Francisco Goya, The Third of May 1808, 1814]]thumb|Edward Hopper, Nighthawks, 1942, Art Institute of Chicago, Chicago, Illinois

The Night Watch, Rembrandt van RijnThe Night Watch or The Shooting Company of Frans Banning Cocq by Dutch painter Rembrandt van Rijn is one of the most famous paintings in the world. One of its key elements is the effective use of light and shadow (chiaroscuro). Made in 1642, it depicts the eponymous company moving out, led by Captain Frans Banning Cocq (dressed in black, with a red sash) and his lieutenant, Willem van Ruytenburch (dressed in yellow, with a white sash). With effective use of sunlight and shade, Rembrandt leads the eye to the three most important characters among the crowd, the two gentlemen in the centre (from whom the painting gets its original title), and the small girl in the centre left background.

For much of its existence, the painting was coated with a dark varnish which gave the incorrect impression that it depicted a night scene, leading to the name by which it is now commonly known. The heavy varnish was only discovered in the 1940s and restoration began after 1975.

The Third of May 1808, Francisco GoyaThe Third of May 1808 by Spanish painter Francisco Goya commemorates Spanish resistance to Napoleon's armies during the occupation of 1808 in the Peninsular War. The painting's content, presentation, and emotional force secure its status as a groundbreaking, archetypal image of the horrors of war. Although it draws on many sources from both high and popular art, The Third of May 1808 marks a clear break from convention. Diverging from the traditions of Christian art and traditional depictions of war, it has no distinct precedent, and is acknowledged as one of the first paintings of the modern era. According to the art historian Kenneth Clark, The Third of May 1808 is "the first great picture which can be called revolutionary in every sense of the word, in style, in subject, and in intention".

It is set in the early hours of the morning following the uprising and centers on two masses of men: one a rigidly poised firing squad, the other a disorganized group of captives held at gun point. Executioners and victims face each other abruptly across a narrow space; according to Kenneth Clark, "by a stroke of genius [Goya] has contrasted the fierce repetition of the soldiers' attitudes and the steely line of their rifles, with the crumbling irregularity of their target." A square lantern situated on the ground between the two groups throws a dramatic light on the scene. The brightest illumination falls on the huddled victims to the left, whose numbers include a monk or friar in prayer. The central figure is the brilliantly lit man kneeling amid the bloodied corpses of those already executed, his arms flung wide in either appeal or defiance.

The painting is structurally and thematically tied to traditions of martyrdom in Christian art, as exemplified in the dramatic use of chiaroscuro, and the appeal to life juxtaposed with the inevitability of imminent execution. However, Goya's painting departs from this tradition. Works that depicted violence, such as those by Jusepe de Ribera, feature an artful technique and harmonious composition which anticipate the "crown of martyrdom" for the victim.

The lantern as a source of illumination in art was widely used by Baroque artists, and perfected by Caravaggio. Traditionally a dramatic light source and the resultant chiaroscuro were used as metaphors for the presence of God. Illumination by torch or candlelight took on religious connotations; but in The Third of May the lantern manifests no such miracle. Rather, it affords light only so that the firing squad may complete its grim work, and provides a stark illumination so that the viewer may bear witness to wanton violence. The traditional role of light in art as a conduit for the spiritual has been subverted.

The Starry Night, Vincent van GoghThe Starry Night, made by Dutch artist Vincent van Gogh, depicts his memory of the view outside his sanitorium room window at Saint-Rémy-de-Provence (located in southern France) at night. Although Van Gogh was not very happy with the painting, art historian Joachim Pissarro cites The Starry Night as an exemplar of the artist's fascination with the nocturnal. One of Van Gogh's most popular pieces, the painting is widely hailed as his magnum opus.

Nighthawks, Edward Hopper
Edward Hopper had a lifelong interest in capturing the effect of light on the objects it touched, including the nighttime effect of artificial, man-made light spilling out of windows, doorways and porches. Nighthawks was probably Hopper's most ambitious essay in capturing the night-time effects of man-made light. For one thing, the diner's plate-glass windows cause significant light to spill out onto the sidewalk and the brownstones on the far side of the street. As well, interior light comes from more than a single lightbulb, with the result that multiple shadows are cast, and some spots are brighter than others as a consequence of being lit from more than one angle. Across the street, the line of shadow caused by the upper edge of the diner window is clearly visible towards the top of the painting.  These windows, and the ones below them as well, are partly lit by an unseen streetlight, which projects its own mix of light and shadow. As a final note, the bright interior light causes some of the surfaces within the diner to be reflective. This is clearest in the case of the right-hand edge of the rear window, which reflects a vertical yellow band of interior wall, but fainter reflections can also be made out, in the counter-top, of three of the diner's occupants. None of these reflections would be visible in daylight.

 The Empire of Light, René Magritte 
In his 1950 painting The Empire of Light, René Magritte (1898–1967), explores the illusion of night and day, and the paradox of time and light. On the top half of his canvas Magritte paints a clear blue sky and white clouds that radiate bright daytime; while on the bottom half of his canvas below the sky, he paints a street, sidewalk, trees and houses all steeped in the darkness of night. The darkened trees and darkened houses appear to be in nighttime shadows, in the middle of the night; and the sidewalk streetlight is on to guide the way. Some of the questions implied by these pictures include is it night-time? is it daytime? or is it just a painting? The Empire of Light is one of a series of paintings that René Magritte painted between 1950 and 1954 that explores his surrealist insight into illusion and reality, using night and day as his subject.

Gallery

See also
 Black Paintings
 Nocturne (painting)
 History of painting
 Night photography

Notes

References

Sources
 Anderson, Ronald and Anne Koval. (2002). James McNeill Whistler: Beyond the Myth. Da Capo Press. . (Note: need to verify this was the edition used.)
 Boime, Albert. (1990). Art in an Age of Bonapartism, 1800–1815. The University of Chicago Press. .
 Blunt, Anthony. (1999) [1953]. Art and Architecture in France, 1500–1700. Yale University Press. .
 Boka, Georges and Bernard Courteau. (1994). Rembrandt's Nightwatch : The Mystery Revealed. Georges Boka Editeur. .
 Campbell, Lorne, National Gallery Catalogues (new series). (1998). The Fifteenth Century Netherlandish Paintings. National Gallery Publications. .
 Clark, Kenneth. (1968). Looking at Pictures. Beacon Press. . (found on Artchive)
 Duffy, Jean H. (1998). Reading Between the Lines: Claude Simon and the Visual Arts. Volume 2 of Modern French Writers. Liverpool University Press. .
 Dyos, H. J. and Michael Wolff (eds.) (1999) [1973]. The Victorian City: Images and Realities, 2 Volumes. Psychology Press. .
 Farquhar, Maria. (1855). Biographical catalog of the principal Italian painters: with a table of the contemporary schools of Italy. Designed as a hand-book to the picture gallery. J. Murray.
 Favorite, Malaika. (1991). Illuminated Manuscript: Poems and Prints. New Orleans Poetry Journal. Journal Press Books: Louisiana Legacy. .
 Freedberg, Sydney J. (1971). Painting in Italy, 1500–1600, first edition. The Pelican History of Art. Harmondsworth and Baltimore: Penguin Books. .
 Gardner, Helen and Fred S. Kleiner. (2009). Gardner's Art Through the Ages: A Concise Global History. (2nd edition). Cengage Learning. .
 Hagen, Rose-Marie and Hagen, Rainer. (28 February 2003.) What Great Paintings Say. Taschen. 
 Henderson, Andrea and Vincent Katz. (2008). Picturing New York: The Art of Yvonne Jacquette and Rudy Burckhardt. Museum of the City of New York, Contributor. Bunker Hill Publishing. .
 Licht, Fred. (1979). Goya: The Origins of the Modern Temper in Art. Universe Books. 
 Lambourne, Lionel. (1999). Victorian Painting. London: Phaidon Press.
 Norman, Diana. (1995). Siena, Florence and Padua: Art, Society and Religion 1280–1400, Volume II. Yale University Press. .
 Paoletti, John T. and Gary M. Radke. (2005). Art in Renaissance Italy, 3rd edition. Laurence King Publishing. .
 Peters, Lisa N. (1998). James McNeil Whistler. Todtri. .
 Robertson, Alexander. (1996). Atkinson Grimshaw. London: Phaidon Press. .
 Schechner, Sara. (1999). Comets, Popular Culture, and the Birth of Modern Cosmology. Princeton University Press. .
 Schiller, Gertrud. (1971). Iconography of Christian Art, Vol. I. (English trans from German), Lund Humphries, London. .
 Steer, Isabella. (2002). The History of British Art. Bath: Parragon. 
 Waller, Philip J. (1983). Town, City, and Nation. Oxford: Oxford University Press.
 Wood, Christopher. (1999). Victorian Painting. Boston: Little, Brown & Co.
 Zara, Christopher. (2012). Tortured Artists: From Picasso and Monroe to Warhol and Winehouse, the Twisted Secrets of the World's Most Creative Minds. Adams Media. .

Possible sources
 Jethani, S (2009). The Divine Commodity: Discovering a Faith Beyond Consumer Christianity. Grand Rapids, MI: Zondervan (eBook). .
 Selz, Peter. (1974). German Expressionist Painting. University of California Press. .
 Suckale, Robert and Manfred Wundram, Andreas Prater, Hermann Bauer, Eva-Gesine Baur. (2002). Masterpieces of Western Art: A History of Art in 900 Individual Studies from the Gothic to the Present Day. Taschen. .
 Taylor, William Edward and Harriet Garcia Warkel, Margaret Taylor Burroughs. (authors) Indianapolis Museum of Art. (ed.) (1996). A Shared Heritage: Art by Four African Americans. Undiana University Press. .
 Van de Wetering, Ernst. (2002). Rembrandt: The Painter at Work. Rembrandt Series. Amsterdam University Press. .
 Van Gogh, Vincent and Sjraar van Heugten, Joachim Pissarro, Chris Stolwijk. (2008). Van Gogh and the Colors of the Night The Museum of Modern Art. .

Further reading
 Anderson, Nancy. (2003). Frederic Remington: The Color of Night. Princeton University Press. .
 Denham, Robert D. (2010). Poets on Paintings: A Bibliography. McFarland. .
 Elkins, James (2004). Pictures & Tears: A History of People Who Have Cried in Front of Paintings. London: Routledge. .
 Erickson, K (1998). At Eternity's Gate: The Spiritual Vision Of Vincent van Gogh. Grand Rapids, MI: William B. Eerdsmans Publishing. .
 Greenaway, Peter. (2006). Nightwatching: a view of Rembrandt's The Night Watch. Veenman. .
 Katz, Alex and Donald Burton Kuspit. (1991). Night paintings. H.N. Abrams. .
 "The Life of Christ: The Story of Christ: The noblest paintings of the Saviour's life were done by Giotto for a chapel in Italy." Life Magazine, Time, Inc. 27 December 1948. 25: 26. p. 32–57. ISSN 0024-3019.
 MacDonald, Margaret F. (2001). Palaces in the Night: Whistler in Venice. University of California Press. .
 Museum of Fine Arts, Boston; Hokusai Katsushika; Kojiro Tomita. (1957). Day and night in the four seasons. Volume 14 of Picture book series. Museum of Fine Arts.
 Nasgaard, Roald. (2007). Abstract Painting in Canada.'' Douglas & McIntyre. .

External links

Painting
Night in culture
Artistic techniques
Moon in art